Přebuz is a town in Sokolov District in the Karlovy Vary Region of the Czech Republic. It is the smallest town in the Czech Republic by population, which was 77 inhabitants as of 2022.

History

The foundation of Přebuz is connected with rich finds of tin ore. According to its chronicle from 1836, Přebuz was founded in 1347 by German colonizers. Although this date is unconfirmed, it is considered probable. The first written mention of Přebuz is from 1542. In 1553, Přebuz gained status and rights of a mining town.

Before World War II, the town had about 3,000 inhabitants. From 1938 to 1945 it was one of the municipalities in Sudetenland. After the war, the population has decreased significantly because of expulsion of Germans and termination of mining.

References

Cities and towns in the Czech Republic
Populated places in Sokolov District